Massseron is a surname. Notable people with the surname include:

  (1880–1959), French author
 Paul Masseron (born 1950), French civil servant and minister of the principality of Monaco